Port Pirie is a small city on the east coast of the Spencer Gulf in South Australia,  north of the state capital, Adelaide. The city has an expansive history which dates back to 1845. Port Pirie was the first proclaimed regional city in South Australia and is currently the second most important and second busiest port in the state.

The city was founded in 1845, and at the 2016 Census had a population of 15,343. Port Pirie is the eighth most populous city in South Australia after Adelaide, Mount Gambier, Gawler, Mount Barker, Whyalla, Murray Bridge and Port Lincoln.

The city's economy is dominated by one of the world's largest lead smelters, operated by Nyrstar. in 2014 the smelter underwent a $650 million upgrade, of which $291 million was underwritten by the state government to replace some of the old existing plant and to reduce airborne lead emissions drastically. Regardless of these upgrades Blood lead levels in young children continue to rise. In 2021 a report from the South Australian Health Department found an average blood level of 7.3 mg/dL in young children, compared to a finding of 5.3 mg/dL in 2014, and an upward trend of airborne lead levels. It also produces refined silver, copper, acid, gold and Various other by-products. Port Pirie is the largest city and the main retail centre of the Mid North region of South Australia.

History
Prior to European settlement, the location that became Port Pirie was occupied by the indigenous tribe of Nukunu. The location was called 'Tarparrie', which is suspected to mean "Muddy Creek". The first European to see the location was Matthew Flinders in 1802 as he explored the Spencer Gulf by boat. The first land discovery of the location by a European was by the explorer Edward Eyre, who explored regions around Port Augusta. John Horrocks also discovered a pass through the Flinders Ranges to the coast, now named Horrocks Pass.

The town was originally called Samuel's Creek after the discovery of Muddy Creek by Samuel Germein. In 1848, Matthew Smith and Emanuel Solomon bought  and subdivided it as a township to be known as Port Pirie. Little development occurred on site and by the late 1860s there were only three woolsheds on the riverfront.

As far back as 1943, a plan existed to build a new station to remove trains from Ellen Street. As part of the gauge conversion of the Port Pirie to Broken Hill line, Mary Elie Street station was built to replace both Ellen Street and Port Pirie Junction stations.

When opened, the new station was the meeting point for the Commonwealth Railways and South Australian Railways networks with through trains changing locomotives and crews, so the disadvantages were not as notable. However, after both became part of Australian National in July 1975 and trains began to operate in and out with the same locomotives, trains began to operate via Coonamia station on the outskirts of the city.

Mary Ellie Street station was eventually closed in the 1990s and in 2009 was redeveloped as the city's library. Until 2012, a GM class locomotive and three carriages were stabled at the platform.

A freight line continues to operate into Port Pirie, feeding the metals plant with raw materials from Broken Hill, and transporting the processed material to Adelaide. This line is managed by Bowmans Rail.

Sea transport 

Port Pirie's marine facilities, managed by Flinders Ports, handle up to 100 ship visits annually, up to Handymax size, for  commodities such as mineral concentrates, refined lead and zinc, coal, grain, and general cargo.

Bridge to nowhere 

John Pirie Bridge, locally known as 'the bridge to nowhere', was built in the 1970s to encourage development of industry on the other side of Port Pirie Creek. Construction cost $410,000 and lasted 26 weeks. It was officially named the John Pirie Bridge in 1980. The land across the bridge remains undeveloped.

Industry and employment

The main industries are the smelting of metals, and the operation of silos to hold grain.

, Port Pirie is the locality of the largest lead smelter and refinery in the southern hemisphere; a lead smelter has been there since the 1880s. The owner since 2007, Nyrstar, is the city's main employer., and high blood lead levels in the local population are an ongoing concern. The Stack, which can be seen kilometres away, is 205 metres tall, and is the tallest structure in the state. In 2006 Zinifex formed a joint venture with Umicore to create Nyrstar, which owns the smelter, with the intention that it would eventually be an entity separate from the parent companies.

Flinders Industrial, a new industrial estate, is currently in its second stage and is planned to be home to the new council depot. There were plans to build a sulphuric acid plant for the benefit of the Nyrstar Smelter, but this project has been shelved and deemed not feasible.

Development
A $3.3 million cultural precinct funded by the Port Pirie Regional Council and the Federal Government was completed in 2010. A committee is also looking at building a multi-purpose stadium. The swimming pool was modernised after receiving a $1 million refit. A major waste recovery facility was opened in 2013, in which all waste and recycled material is sorted under one roof. In 2012 Port Pirie Regional Council completed a $5 million community water recycling project with Nyrstar which allows 350 megalitres of water from the smelter to be reused. Plans are under way to establish a large shopping complex in the city with an additional supermarket and department store. The city's population is continually growing and property prices continue to rise. The Port Pirie Regional Council has a number of large projects that will be launched or completed next financial year.

Waterfront development
The PPRC completed a major redevelopment of its foreshore area in 2014 including the construction of the Solomontown Beach Plaza, opening up Beach abroad to through traffic, replacing lighting along the beach and improving security. In addition, by the end of 2014, the council aims to replace and duplicate the current Solomontown boat ramp and undertake dredging in the vicinity of the ramp. This investment is aimed at creating a waterfront which will revitalise the area from the Main Road boat ramp up to the area off Ellen street.

Tenby10 (Lead levels)

Lead smelters contribute to several environmental problems, especially raised  lead levels in the blood of some of the town population. The problem is particularly significant in many children who have grown up in the area. A state government project addressed this. Nyrstar plans to progressively reduce lead in blood levels such that ultimately 95% of all children meet the national goal of 10 micrograms per decilitre. This has been known as the tenby10 project. Community lead in blood levels in children are now at less than half the level that they were in the mid 1980s.

The Port Pirie smelter conducted a project to reduce lead levels in children to less than 10 micrograms per decilitre by the end of 2010.

The goal we are committed to achieving is for at least 95% of our children aged 0 to 4 to have a blood lead level below ten micrograms per decilitre of blood (the first ten in tenby10) by the end of 2010 (the second ten in tenby10).

Higher concentrations of lead have been found in the organs of bottlenose dolphins stranded near the lead smelter, compared to dolphins stranded elsewhere in South Australia. The health impacts of these metals on dolphins has been examined and some associations between high metal concentrations and kidney toxicity were noted.

Education and culture 

Port Pirie is the main centre for the Mid North area. Many towns in the area rely on Port Pirie for shopping and employment. It also has many educational institutions such as John Pirie Secondary School (years 8-12), St Mark's College (Foundation - year 12), Mid North Christian College (reception - year 12), many preschools and primary schools, and a TAFE campus (adult education).

Port Pirie is home to the National Trust Historic and Folk Museum and Memorial Park. Every September and October the city hosts a country music festival. It has significant Italian and Greek communities. The Keith Michell Theatre, within the Northern Festival Centre, is named after the renowned actor Keith Michell, who grew up in Warnertown,  from Port Pirie.

News media
The town's main newspaper, The Recorder, was first published 21 March 1885 as The Port Pirie Advocate and Areas News. In 1971, a brief experiment, known as the Northern Observer (7 July - 30 August 1971), occurred when The Recorder and The Transcontinental from Port Augusta were published under a combined title in Port Pirie. The Recorder, which is still in print today (Tuesdays and Thursdays), has recently changed to a morning paper, after being delivered at around 3:00 pm. Other Port Pirie newspapers include the free The Flinders News (Wednesdays), and The Advertiser, which covers some Port Pirie news, but to a very small extent.

Another newspaper, the Port Pirie Advertiser (7 April 1898 – 28 June 1924) was also published by Robert Osborne. A further publication was the short-lived Saturday Times (6 December 1913 – 15 August 1914), printed by Roy Harold Butler and closed at the start of the Great War.

Television coverage in the city is provided by the ABC, SBS, Southern Cross (7, 9 and 10) and Austar. Several radio stations cover Port Pirie, including ABC 639AM, ABC 891AM, 1044 5CS, 1242 5AU, triple j, Magic FM and Trax FM (a community station).

Governance

State and federal

The results shown are from "Port Pirie West", the largest polling booth in Port Pirie, which is at the SA TAFE Campus.

Port Pirie is part of the federal division of Grey, and has been represented by Liberal MP Rowan Ramsey since 2007. Grey is held with a margin of 4.43% but is considered a safe Liberal seat.

The city is part of the state electoral district of Frome, which had been held since 1993 by former Liberal Premier, Rob Kerin, with a margin of 3.4%. It also has been considered a safe Liberal seat.

Although the region is generally Liberal-leaning because of its agricultural base, Port Pirie is an industrial centre that is favourable to the Australian Labor Party.

In late 2008 Rob Kerin announced his retirement, which led to a by-election being held in January 2009. Port Pirie mayor Geoff Brock announced his candidacy as an independent, and subsequently took the seat from the Liberals at the 2009 Frome by-election. After the poll for the by-election had closed and first preferences had been counted, (but before other preferences had been distributed), the result was Lib: 39.2%; ALP: 26.1%; Brock 23.6%; Nat: 6.6%; Greens: 3.8%; Other: 0.7%.

State Opposition Leader Martin Hamilton-Smith (Liberal Party) claimed victory, prematurely. Distribution of National Party, Greens and other preferences placed Brock ahead of the ALP candidate. Hence with the assistance of the ALP candidate's preferences, Geoff Brock won the by-election 51.7% to 48.3% for the Liberal candidate.

Local government
Port Pirie and some of the sparsely inhabited areas around it are in the Port Pirie Regional Council local government area.

Notable residents
Sportspeople
 Nip Pellew (1893-1981), Australian Test cricketer and North Adelaide player
 Mark Bickley (1969-), Adelaide Crows dual premiership captain
 Mark Jamar (1982-), Melbourne Demons player and all-Australian
 David Tiller (1958-), North Adelaide Roosters captain and premiership player
 Brodie Atkinson (1972-), St. Kilda, Adelaide Crows, North Adelaide premiership player (1991), Sturt premiership player (2002) and Magarey Medal winner (1997)
 Elijah Ware (1983-), Port Adelaide and Central Districts player and premiership player
 Abby Bishop (1989-), Canberra Capitals player
 Lewis Johnston (1991-), Sydney Swans, Adelaide Crows
 Sam Mayes (1994-), North Adelaide, Brisbane Lions (2013-2018), Port Adelaide (2019-)
Others
 Geoff Brock, State Politician
 Ted Connelly, State Politician
 Andrew Lacey (1887–1946), Federal and State Politician, State Leader of the ALP 1933–1938
 Sir Hugh Cairns (1896–1952), Rhodes Scholar, Neurosurgeon and crash helmet proponent
 Keith Michell (1928-2015), Actor
 John Noble (1948-), Actor and director
 Robert Stigwood (1934-2016), Music entrepreneur and impresario

See also
 :Category:People from Port Pirie
 Diocese of Willochra
 Roman Catholic Diocese of Port Pirie
 Sir John Pirie, 1st Baronet, for whom several places and features are named
 Nyrstar

References

External links

Port Pirie, South Australia reference
Port Pirie Regional Council
"Port Pirie", Travel section, Sydney Morning Herald, 14 January 2008.
"Port Pirie smelter changes from Zinifex to Nyrstar", ABC News, 31 August 2007.
Nystar, Home page - English.

 
1845 establishments in Australia
Cities in South Australia
Mid North (South Australia)
Port cities in South Australia
Spencer Gulf